Burton Miller (January 17, 1926 – March 5, 1982) was an American costume designer. He was perhaps best known for his work on the TV shows The Six Million Dollar Man and Alfred Hitchcock Presents. He tend to work on TV.

He had one Academy Award nomination for Best Costumes for the film Airport '77. He shared his nomination with Edith Head. This was at the 50th Academy Awards.

Selected filmography

The Sting II (1983-released posthumously)
The Nude Bomb (1980)
The Concorde ... Airport '79 (1979)
Damien: Omen II (1978)
Airport '77 (1977)
Earthquake (1974)
Kitten with a Whip (1964)

Selected TV shows

The Six Million Dollar Man 
McCloud
McMillan & Wife 
Columbo
It Takes a Thief 
Rod Serling's Night Gallery 
The Virginian
Ironside
Alfred Hitchcock Presents
Bob Hope Presents the Chrysler Theatre 
Wagon Train

References

External links

1926 births
1982 deaths
American costume designers
People from Pennsylvania